The Lebanon national ice hockey team is the national men's ice hockey team of Lebanon. The team is controlled by the Lebanese Ice Hockey Federation, and on 26 September 2019, became an associate member of the International Ice Hockey Federation (IIHF). Lebanon is currently not ranked in the IIHF World Ranking and has not entered in any IIHF World Championship events.

History

Ice hockey in Lebanon
The Lebanese Ice Hockey Federation, abbreviated as LIHF, and known in French as Fédération Libanaise de Hockey sur Glace, is the governing body that oversees the Lebanese local and international ice hockey teams and development program. Currently based in Montreal, Quebec, Canada, with youth operations based in Beirut, the LIHF also manages the Lebanese national team at international tournaments and friendly matches.

Working closely with Lebanese and Canadian governmental organizations such as the Lebanese Olympic Committee (LOC), the Lebanese Embassy in Canada, the Canadian Embassy in Lebanon, and the Lebanese Business Council of Abu Dhabi. The LIHF is in the current process of filling its requirement to be a member of the International Ice Hockey Federation (IIHF) in the hopes to participate in the official IIHF World Championships, but Lebanon was not a member of the IIHF.

There are notable players of Lebanese-origin, Nazem Kadri who currently plays for the Calgary Flames in the NHL, most notably won the Stanley Cup with the Colorado Avalanche in 2022, Fabian Joseph who represented Canada, and Ed Hatoum who also played in the NHL for Detroit, and then Vancouver. Kadri has also represented Canada internationally. Hatoum was born in Beirut. Joseph has won two silver medals at the Winter Olympics in 1992 and 1994.

National team
Lebanon played a friendly match against Haiti (consists of mostly Canadian-based players) on 23 April 2017, at Aréna Raymond-Bourque in Saint-Laurent, Quebec, Canada, with both teams made their international debut. Lebanon get its first international win over Haiti by a score of 7–4.

Tournament record

Amerigol LATAM Cup

All-time record against other national teams
Last match update: 16 October 2021

All-time record against clubs and B teams
Last match update: 22 December 2018

Note: Lebanon was awarded a 9–0 win over Egypt, but capped at 5–0 due to a blowout rule.

See also
Lebanon men's national ball hockey team

References

External links
MEN'S NATIONAL TEAM at Lebanese Ice Hockey Federation

National ice hockey teams in the Arab world
National ice hockey teams in Asia
Ice hockey